KSNO-FM (103.9 FM), is a radio station broadcasting a classic rock format. Licensed to Snowmass Village, Colorado, United States, it serves the Aspen and Roaring Fork Valley area, broadcasting from Glenwood Springs to Aspen and into the Snowmass Creek Valley, Redstone and beyond.  

KSNO was founded as an AM station in 1964 and received its FM licence in the 1980's. 

The station is owned by Wild Goose LLC, under the management of Andrew C. Scott, founder of the Open Mind Project (www.openmindproject.com).  KSNO also broadcasts live on the web at www.KSNO.com.

External links

SNO-FM
Adult album alternative radio stations in the United States